The Jamaican Movement for the Advancement of Literacy, established in 1974, is a government body in Jamaica, an offshoot of the American National Literacy Board. It has specific goals regarding improving literacy rates in Jamaica.

References

Educational organisations based in Jamaica
Organizations promoting literacy